Robert William Cone (March 19, 1957 – September 19, 2016) was a United States Army four-star general who last served as the commanding general of United States Army Training and Doctrine Command (TRADOC). He assumed command of TRADOC on April 29, 2011. He previously served as the commander of Fort Hood and III Corps on September 22, 2009, with which he deployed to Iraq in February 2010, and served as the Deputy Commanding General for Operations, United States Forces – Iraq, until February 2011.  Prior to that, he served as the Special Assistant to the Commanding General of TRADOC. He retired in 2014.

Personal life and education

Cone was a native of Manchester, New Hampshire, born on March 19, 1957. He graduated from Memorial High School, Manchester, New Hampshire in 1975. He graduated from the United States Military Academy with a Bachelor of Science degree in 1979 and was commissioned as a second lieutenant in the Armor Branch. Cone earned a Master of Arts degree in Sociology from the University of Texas at Austin.

Cone's military education includes the Naval War College, the United States Army Command and General Staff College, the Infantry Officer Advanced Course, and the Armor Officer Basic Course.

Cone was diagnosed with stage four metastatic prostate cancer in 2011, four months following his promotion to four-star general and underwent clinical trial therapy. Cone and his wife Jill had moved to Shawano, Wisconsin in 2014. Cone died on September 19, 2016 at a hospital in Green Bay, Wisconsin. He was buried at Arlington National Cemetery on December 9, 2016.

The General Robert W. Cone Heritage Center in Fort Irwin, California, opened on August 28, 2021, is named after him.

Military career

Cone served in a variety of command, staff, and operational assignments in the United States, Germany, and Southwest Asia.

His first duty assignment was with the 2nd Armored Division at Fort Hood, Texas, where he served as a Platoon Leader and Troop Executive Officer in the 2nd Squadron, 1st Cavalry Regiment.

In October 1981, Cone became the Aide-de-Camp to the Assistant Division Commander, 2nd Armored Division. He then served as the Battalion Maintenance Officer, Combat Service Support Company Commander, and Tank Company Commander in the 1st Battalion, 67th Armored Regiment (1-67 AR). He attended the Infantry Advanced Course in 1985, followed by graduate school at the University of Texas at Austin. Next, Cone served as an Instructor and Assistant Professor in the Department of Behavioral Sciences and Leadership at the United States Military Academy at West Point, New York. After selection and completion of United States Army Command and General Staff College at Fort Leavenworth, Kansas, Cone reported to the 11th Armored Cavalry Regiment (Blackhorse Regiment) in Fulda, Germany.

Cone served as the 2nd Squadron Operations Officer (S-3) during Operation Desert Storm, became the Regimental Operations Officer (S-3) in November 1991, then the Regimental Executive Officer in March 1993. He left the 11th Armored Cavalry Regiment in the spring of 1994. In his next assignment, Cone moved to Fort Bliss, Texas, and became the Regimental Executive Officer of the 3rd Armored Cavalry Regiment (Brave Rifles). He assumed command of the 1st Squadron, 3rd Armored Cavalry Regiment in October 1994. After squadron command, he served as the Special Assistant to the Commanding General, Fort Carson, Colorado, then reported to the Naval War College in Newport, Rhode Island, in 1997.

Cone became the Division Operations Officer (G-3) of the 4th Infantry Division (Mechanized), Fort Hood, Texas, in July 1998. He assumed command of the 2d Brigade, 4th Infantry Division, the following year. His brigade deployed to South Korea as part of Exercise Foal Eagle. He led his brigade in the army's Division Capstone Exercise in April 2001 as the culminating event in the development of the heavy digital force.

Following brigade command, Cone served as the Director of the Joint Advanced Warfighting Program, Institute for Defense Analyses located in Alexandria, Virginia, where he was responsible for developing joint force concepts and experiments. He participated in Operation Iraqi Freedom in 2003 as the Director of the United States Joint Forces Command (JFCOM) Joint Lessons Learned Collection Team. Cone was tasked to capture, document, and report real time lessons learned from combat operations in Iraq and Afghanistan. His work led to the establishment of the Joint Center for Operational Analysis at JFCOM. After returning from the Middle East, Cone served as the Director of the JFCOM Joint Center for Operational Analysis in Suffolk, Virginia.

Senior command

In September 2004, Cone became the Commanding General of the United States Army's National Training Center (NTC) at Fort Irwin, California. During his 33-month command, Cone implemented a broad array of changes reorienting training on counterinsurgency operations. In conjunction with the Joint IED Defeat Organization (JIEDDO), Cone established the Joint Center of Operational Excellence in training for the defeat of improvised explosive devices (IED) at the NTC.

Cone deployed to Afghanistan in June 2007 as part of Operation Enduring Freedom and assumed command of the Combined Security Transition Command - Afghanistan. His 18-month command focused on developing the Afghan National Army and Police. During his tenure, the Afghan National Army expanded from 50,000 troops to close to 80,000 and a broad array of reforms were implemented to address corruption and training in the Afghan National Police.

After returning from Afghanistan, Cone served as the Special Assistant to the Army Chief of Staff then became the Special Assistant to the Commanding General of the United States Army Training and Doctrine Command where he was responsible for officer and enlisted soldier Initial Entry Training.

In September 2009, Cone assumed command of III Corps and Fort Hood, Texas. In March 2010, he deployed to Iraq with III Corps Headquarters and became the Deputy Commanding General for Operations, the second highest-ranking military officer in United States Forces – Iraq until 8 February 2011. He had responsibility for operations throughout the entire country, including the development and training of fielded Iraqi Security Forces. He oversaw the transition from Operation Iraqi Freedom and counterinsurgency operations to Operation New Dawn and stability operations. This transition included the drawdown of service members from roughly 100,000 to less than 50,000 and the transfer of more than 120 bases, the largest single movement of military personnel and equipment since World War II. Cone returned to Fort Hood on 9 February 2011. He then was promoted to the four-star rank of general and took command of United States Army Training and Doctrine Command in April 2011.

Awards and decorations

References

External links

Official III Corps and Fort Hood Website
Official U.S. Army Training and Doctrine Command Website
Cone's presentation at the Pritzker Military Museum & Library on November 11, 2013

1957 births
2016 deaths
Deaths from cancer in Wisconsin
United States Army generals
United States Army Command and General Staff College alumni
People from Manchester, New Hampshire
People from Shawano, Wisconsin
Military personnel from New Hampshire
Recipients of the Legion of Merit
United States Military Academy alumni
University of Texas at Austin College of Liberal Arts alumni
Recipients of the Defense Superior Service Medal
Recipients of the Defense Distinguished Service Medal
Military personnel from Wisconsin